James Henry Wootton-Davies (1884–1964) was Conservative Party MP for Heywood and Radcliffe in Lancashire.

When his predecessor died in 1940 this led to a by-election, and because of the wartime truce he was returned unopposed.  He lost the seat to Labour at the 1945 general election.

He was the chief chemist at Lunts of Port Sunlight near Liverpool. He changed his name from Davies to Wootton-Davies after marrying Gertrude Mabel Wotton (who added an extra o in Wotton because she felt it was too common) thus becoming Wootton-Davies.  She was known as Shirley, her chosen name when working as a model for Norman Hartnel

He lived in Starlings Castle, Bronygarth, then moved to Bronwilfa Hall near Wrexham where James Henry died in 1964.

James Henry owned a farm called Gilar near Pentrefoelas which he gave to his son James William Wootton-Davies as a wedding present, in 1961.

External links 

Conservative Party (UK) MPs for English constituencies
1884 births
1964 deaths
Place of birth missing
Place of death missing
People from the Metropolitan Borough of Wirral
UK MPs 1935–1945